Shamil Alievitch Musaev is a Russian freestyle wrestler who currently competes at 97 kilograms. The 2017 Junior World Champion, Musaev was the 2019 U23 World and European silver medalist and has medaled at prestigious Russian tournaments, such as the Russian Nationals and the Golden Grand Prix Ivan Yarygin (including a gold medal performance in 2019).

External links

References 

Living people
Date of birth missing (living people)
Place of birth missing (living people)
Russian male sport wrestlers
Year of birth missing (living people)
21st-century Russian people